Cupra Marittima is a comune (municipality) in the Province of Ascoli Piceno in the Italian region Marche, located about  southeast of Ancona and about  northeast of Ascoli Piceno.

Cupra Marittima borders the following municipalities: Grottammare, Massignano, Ripatransone.

History 
The settlement of Cupra Maritina existed near the current town, in the neighbourhood of an ancient temple of the Sabine goddess Cupra, which was restored by Hadrian in 127 CE. At the site, the remains of what was believed to be the temple were more probably those of the forum of the town, as is indicated by the discovery of fragments of a calendar and of a statue of Hadrian. Some statuettes of Juno were also among the finds. An inscription of a water reservoir erected in 7 BCE is also recorded. But the more ancient Picene town appears to have been situated near the hill of S. Andrea, a little way to the south, where pre-Roman tombs were discovered.

Demographic evolution

See also
Riviera delle Palme (Marche)

References

External links
 www.comune.cupra-marittima.ap.it/

Cities and towns in the Marche